"Someone" is a song written by Steve Dorff, Charlie Black and Austin Roberts, and recorded by American country music artist Lee Greenwood.  It was released in May 1987 as the first single from the album If There's Any Justice.  The song reached #5 on the Billboard Hot Country Singles & Tracks chart.

Chart performance

References

1987 singles
1987 songs
Lee Greenwood songs
Songs written by Steve Dorff
Song recordings produced by Jimmy Bowen
MCA Records singles
Songs written by Charlie Black
Songs written by Austin Roberts (singer)